Jimmy 'The Wapping Assassin' Flint (born 6 November 1952) is an English actor, playwright and retired boxer.

Early years 

Jimmy was born and brought up in Wapping, East London as the son of a docker. Jimmy started off his amateur boxing career in 1963 at the Broad Street Boxing Club in Stepney. He then went on to start his professional boxing career in 1973 as a Featherweight.

Acting career 

After getting frustrated with boxing, Jimmy got involved in acting with the director Ron Peck in the film Empire State. With the success of the film, this prompted his passion for acting and writing. Shortly afterwards Jimmy wrote the one man play entitled 'The Wapping Assassin' after his own life story. He has subsequently appeared in major films such as The Krays and Guy Ritchie's Lock, Stock and Two Smoking Barrels and Revolver.

Partial filmography

 The Bill (2010)
 Rise of the Footsoldier (2007)
 Revolver (2005)
 Messiah: The Promise (2004)
 Kavanagh QC (1999)
 Casualty (1999)
 Lock, Stock and Two Smoking Barrels (1998)
 Real Money (1996)
 Look at It This Way (1992)
 Uncle Vanya BBC (1991)
 Hands of a Murderer (1990)
 The Krays (1990)
 Fighters (1988)
 Empire State (1987)

References

External links 
  Jimmy Flint Biography
 
  Jimmy Flint Boxing Record
  Fight Records

1952 births
Living people
English male film actors
English male boxers
Featherweight boxers